The Roman Catholic  Diocese of Nuevo Casas Grandes is a suffragan diocese of the Archdiocese of Chihuahua, in Mexico. It was created as a territorial prelature in 1977 and elevated in 2000. It has an area of 36,320, a population of 149,000, a Catholic population of 130,000, 37 priests, and 45 religious.

Ordinaries
Hilario Chávez Joya, M.N.M. (1977–2004) - Bishop Emeritus; died in 2010
Gerardo de Jesús Rojas López (2004–2010) - Transferred by Pope Benedict XVI on Tuesday, December 7, 2010, to be the Bishop of the Roman Catholic Diocese of Tabasco, Mexico
Jesús José Herrera Quiñonez (2011–Present), appointed by Pope Benedict XVI, on Thursday, October 27, 2011; formerly a Monsignor and a pastor in the clergy of the Roman Catholic Diocese of Mexicali, Mexico; he was born in Mexicali in 1961 and ordained a priest in 1987; he has served as Diocesan Assistant to the Christian Family Movement, and as Secretary and Chancellor of the Diocesan Curia.

Episcopal See
Nuevo Casas Grandes, Chihuahua

References

External links and references

Nuevo Casas Grandes
Nuevo Casas Grandes, Roman Catholic Diocese of
Nuevo Casas Grandes
Nuevo Casas Grandes
1977 establishments in Mexico